"Nada" (English: "Nothing") is the third single from the Spanish born-Mexican singer Belinda, from her fourth studio album Catarsis. It was released on radio on July 5, 2013 by Capitol Latin.

Background 
"Nada" was announced as the third single by Belinda via her Twitter account, was announced that the third single to promote the album would be a ballad that tells a story of impossible love. The song was released to radio stations globally in early July 2013.

Composition 
The song was written by American songwriter nominated for Grammy Awards, Diane Warren, while the Spanish adaptation was provided by Mexican singer Belinda, and was produced by the Italian musician and record producer Loris Ceroni. The song is a Spanish adaptation of the song "Weightless". The single is a piano-ballad with a devastating vocals and a sound reminds to the melodic style of her debut self-titled album "Belinda" (2003) and the single "Ángel".

Video 
On October 15, 2013, Belinda released a lyrical music video on her official account on YouTube. The video shows Belinda performing the song, it uses winter landscapes as background.

Chart performance

Release dates

References 

2013 songs
2013 singles
Belinda Peregrín songs
Capitol Latin singles
2010s ballads
Songs written by Belinda Peregrín
Songs written by Diane Warren
Spanish-language songs
Universal Music Latin Entertainment singles
EMI Records singles
Pop ballads